SmartLink may refer to:
 SmartLink (smart card), an electronic fare collection system used by the Port Authority of New York and New Jersey
 SmartLink (television), a wireless communications protocol
 SmartLink (lighting), a wireless communication protocol for lighting products.
 smart tags, a feature of MS Office and Internet Explorer
 Smartlink, another name for AV.link, a television-related protocol
 Smart links, a type of landing page common

See also
 Smart linking